Oscar De Cock (born 1881, date of death unknown) was a Belgian rower who competed in the 1900 Summer Olympics.

He was part of the Belgian boat Royal Club Nautique de Gand, which won the silver medal in the men's eight.

References

External links

1881 births
Year of death missing
Belgian male rowers
Olympic rowers of Belgium
Rowers at the 1900 Summer Olympics
Olympic silver medalists for Belgium
Royal Club Nautique de Gand rowers
Olympic medalists in rowing
Medalists at the 1900 Summer Olympics
European Rowing Championships medalists
Date of birth missing
Place of birth missing
Place of death missing
20th-century Belgian people